Team jumping equestrian at the 2002 Asian Games was held in Busan Equestrian Grounds, Busan, South Korea from October 11 to October 12, 2002.

Schedule
All times are Korea Standard Time (UTC+09:00)

Results
Legend
EL — Eliminated
WD — Withdrawn

References
Results

External links
Official website

Team jumping